Shpat Kasapi (born 1 May 1985) is an Albanian-Macedonian singer and songwriter.

Biography 
Shpat Kasapi was born on 1 May 1985 into an Albanian family in the city of Tetovo, then part of SFR Yugoslavia, present North Macedonia. 
Kasapi participated in Festivali i Këngës 47 for the Eurovision Song Contest 2009. He has previously been in relationships with Miss Universe Kosovo 2011, Afërdita Dreshaj and Qendresa Dulaj.

References

External links 
 

1985 births
Living people
21st-century Macedonian male singers
People from Tetovo
21st-century Albanian male singers
Albanian musicians from North Macedonia
Albanian pop musicians